The Vampire Bat  is a 1933 American Pre-Code horror film directed by Frank R. Strayer and starring Lionel Atwill, Fay Wray, Melvyn Douglas, and Dwight Frye.

Plot
When the villagers of Kleinschloss start dying of blood loss, the town fathers suspect a resurgence of vampirism, but police inspector Karl Brettschneider remains skeptical. Scientist Dr. Otto von Niemann, who cares for the victims, visits a patient who was attacked by a bat, Martha Mueller. Out of appreciation for her kindness, Martha is visited by a mentally challenged man named Hermann Gleib, who claims he likes bats because they are "soft like cat" and "nice".

On the doctor's journey home, he meets Kringen, one of the townsfolk, who claims to have been attacked by the vampire in the form of a bat, but withheld his story from the town in order to not spread fear. Dr. von Niemann encourages Kringen to tell the townsfolk of his story. Kringen becomes suspicious that Gleib may be the vampire due to his obsession with bats. Gleib lives with bats and collects them off the street.

Dr. von Niemann returns to his home, which also houses Brettschneider's love Ruth Bertin, Ruth's hypochondriac aunt Gussie Schnappmann, and servants Emil Borst and Georgiana. Fear of the vampire and suspicion of Gleib quickly spread around the town and people start fearing him. Ms. Mueller is killed that night. The analyses of Dr. von Niemann and another doctor, Dr. Haupt, conclude that the death is the same as all of the previous deaths – blood loss, with two punctures in the neck caused by needle-sharp teeth. Gleib enters the examination, and upon seeing the dead body, runs away screaming.

Next morning, Gleib enters Dr. von Niemann's garden, where Dr. von Niemann, Brettschneider and Bertin are discussing vampires inside the house. The town fathers enter the house and announce that Kringen is dead and Gleib is missing. An angry mob hunts down Gleib and chases him through the countryside and into a cave, where he falls to his death.

That night, Dr. von Niemann is seen telepathically controlling Emil Borst, as he picks up sleeping Georgiana and takes her down to Dr. von Niemann's laboratory, where a strange organism is seen. They then drain her blood from her neck.

Schnappmann then discovers Georgiana's body in her bed. Dr. von Niemann and Brettschneider investigate and find Ms Mueller's crucifix, which Gleib handled the night Dr. von Niemann visited her. Brettschneider is becoming more convinced of the presence of vampires in the village as no other plausible explanations for the deaths can be found. As Gleib was seen in the garden that morning, the two conclude he is guilty.

Upon hearing of Gleib's death, however, Brettschneider's conviction is erased. Dr. von Niemann tells Brettschneider to go home and take sleeping pills, but gives him poison instead, intent on draining his blood. Bertin discovers Dr. von Niemann telepathically controlling Borst, who is at Brettschneider's house. It is revealed that Dr. von Niemann has created an artificial lifeform and is using the blood to feed his organism. He ties Bertin up and gags her in his lab. Borst supposedly enters with Brettschneider's body on a trolley. Dr. von Niemann walks over to Borst, who is revealed to be Brettschneider (who did not take the pills) in costume, with the real Borst on the trolley. Brettschneider pulls a gun on Dr. von Niemann and walks over to untie Bertin. Dr. von Niemann then wrestles Brettschneider, who drops the gun. As the two fight, Borst picks up the gun and shoots Dr. von Niemann before shooting himself.

Cast
 Lionel Atwill as Dr. Otto von Niemann
 Fay Wray as Ruth Bertin
 Melvyn Douglas as Karl Brettschneider
 Maude Eburne as Gussie Schnappmann
 George E. Stone as Kringen
 Dwight Frye as Hermann Gleib
 Robert Frazer as Emil Borst
 Rita Carlisle as Martha Mueller
 Lionel Belmore as Bürgermeister Gustave Schoen
 William V. Mong as Sauer
 Stella Adams as Georgiana
 Paul Weigel as Dr. Holdstadt
 Harrison Greene as Weingarten
 William Humphrey as Dr. Haupt
 Carl Stockdale as Schmidt
 Paul Panzer as Townsman

Production

Fay Wray and Lionel Atwill had been in the successful film Doctor X the previous year, and had already wrapped up work on Mystery of the Wax Museum for Warner Bros. This was quite a large-scale release and would have a lengthy post-production process. Seeing a chance to exploit all the advance press, poverty row studio Majestic Pictures Inc. contracted Wray and Atwill for their own "quickie" horror film, rushing The Vampire Bat into production and releasing it in January 1933.

Majestic Pictures had lower overheads than the larger studios, which were struggling at the time during the Great Depression. Part of the reason that The Vampire Bat looked almost as good as any Universal Pictures horror film is because Majestic leased James Whale's castoffs, the “German Village” backlot sets left over from Frankenstein (1931) and the interior sets from his film The Old Dark House (1932), plus some location shooting at Bronson Caves. Completing the illusion that this was a film from a much bigger studio, Majestic hired actor Dwight Frye to populate scenes with Wray and Atwill. A stock musical theme by Charles Dunworth, "Stealthy Footsteps", was used to accompany the opening credits.

The Vampire Bat ruse worked well for Majestic, which was able to rush the quickie film into theaters less than a month before Warner's release of Mystery of the Wax Museum. According to The Film Daily (January 10, 1933), the film's running time was 63 minutes, like most extant prints.

See also
 List of films in the public domain in the United States
 Vampire film

References

External links

 
 
 
 
 

1933 films
1933 horror films
American black-and-white films
Films directed by Frank R. Strayer
Films set in Europe
American science fiction horror films
American vampire films
1930s science fiction horror films
Majestic Pictures films
Mad scientist films
American serial killer films
American exploitation films
1930s English-language films
1930s American films